Marsel Ismailgeci (born 14 March 2000) is an Albanian professional footballer who plays as a left-back for Herzegovian club HŠK Zrinjski Mostar.

Club career 
In July 2017, Ismailgeci signed his first professional contract with Tirana until June 2021.

Ismailgeci spent most of the 2019–20 Kategoria Superiore season on the bench, however he managed to appear in 21 matches, including 13 as starter, as Tirana won the championship title for the 25th time in their 100th anniversary. His only goal in the league came on 18 July in the 2–0 home win over Flamurtari. In 2019–20 Albanian Cup, where Tirana reached the final, Ismailgeci scored once in eight appearances; the goal, which was his first as a professional, came on 29 January against Kastrioti.

On 19 August 2020, Ismailgeci made his UEFA Champions League debut in Tirana's first qualifying round match against Dinamo Tbilisi; in the 86th minute, he scored from a rebound to make the score 2–0 and help Tirana progress to the next round, also achieving their first win in the competicion after 14 years.

International career 
Ismailgeci made his international debut for Albania on 11 November 2020 in a friendly match against Kosovo.

Career statistics

Club

Honours

Club 
Tirana
Kategoria Superiore: 2019–20 ,2021–22
Kategoria e Parë: 2017–18
Albanian Supercup: 2022

References

External links 

2000 births
Living people
Footballers from Tirana
Albanian footballers
People from Tirana County
People from Tirana
Albania international footballers
Albania youth international footballers
Association football fullbacks
Kategoria Superiore players
KF Tirana players